Winston Davis (born 1958) is a West Indian cricketer.

Winston Davis may also refer to:

Winston Davis (Jamaican cricketer) (1941–1994), Jamaican cricketer
Winston Davis (Kittitian cricketer) (born 1961), Kittitian cricketer